First Methodist Church, also known as First United Methodist Church, is a church in McMinnville, Tennessee.  It was listed on the National Register of Historic Places in 2002.

Its cornerstone was laid in 1886 and it was completed in 1889.  It is important as a High Victorian Gothic church designed by architect Hugh Cathcart Thompson.

References

Churches on the National Register of Historic Places in Tennessee
Gothic Revival church buildings in Tennessee
Churches completed in 1889
19th-century Methodist church buildings in the United States
United Methodist churches in Tennessee
Buildings and structures in Warren County, Tennessee
National Register of Historic Places in Warren County, Tennessee